Robert Henry Cotton (5 November 1909 – 17 January 1979) was an English cricketer.  Cotton was a right-handed batsman who bowled right-arm fast.  He was born at Birmingham, Warwickshire.

Cotton made two first-class appearances for Warwickshire against Lancashire and Sussex in the 1947 County Championship.  Against Lancashire, Cotton was dismissed in Warwickshire's first-innings of 207 for a duck by Eddie Phillipson, while in Lancashire's first-innings he opened the bowling, though went wicketless from his 25 overs which conceded 80 runs.  He wasn't required to bat in Warwickshire's second-innings, with the match ending in a draw.  Against Sussex, he ended not out on 0 in Warwickshire's first-innings total of 216, while in Sussex's first-innings he bowled 6 wicketless overs, though he conceded just 6 runs from them.  He was dismissed for a duck in Warwickshire's second-innings by George Cox, while in Sussex's second-innings he took the wickets of Robert Hunt and Hugh Bartlett, finishing with figures of 2/42 from 13 overs.  These were his only major appearances for Warwickshire.

He died at Warley, Staffordshire on 17 January 1979.

References

External links
Robert Cotton at ESPNcricinfo

1909 births
1979 deaths
Cricketers from Birmingham, West Midlands
English cricketers
Warwickshire cricketers
English cricketers of 1946 to 1968